Sidetalk is an American Instagram show created by Trent Simonian and Jack Byrne. The show utilizes a man-on-the-street technique to interview people across New York City with each episode being approximately one minute long, and is noted for its surreal and/or humorous interviews.

History
Trent Simonian, a graduate of Malibu High School, and Jack Byrne, a graduate of Xavier High School, started the show in the fall of 2019 during their first semester as students at New York University. They had first met after being accepted into NYU during their senior year of high school through mutual friends. Prior to co-creating Sidetalk, Simonian hosted a similar interview-style show in high school called Shark TV, while Byrne interned for The Fat Jewish for five years beginning at age 14.

The duo signed to Brillstein Entertainment Partners and WME in April 2021.

The show received a nomination for the 2021 Streamy Awards in the Indie Show category and two nominations for the 2022 Streamy Awards in the Show of the Year and Unscripted Series categories.

Bing Bong
On October 21, 2021, Simonian and Byrne released an episode titled "Knicks Season Opener" featuring New York Knicks fans celebrating the team's opening night double-overtime victory over the Boston Celtics. One of the fans in the video, Jordie Bloom, says "Bing Bong" into the microphone, a reference to the New York City Subway "doors closing" warning sound which is used at the beginning of each Sidetalk episode. While the phrase itself had been previously popularized in earlier Sidetalk videos, by rapper Nems and others in episodes from Coney Island, it quickly became a rallying cry for the Knicks after the "Knicks Season Opener" video went viral. The phrase was picked up by the official New York Knicks Twitter account, Knicks announcer Mike Breen, and Knicks forward Evan Fournier, and was featured on the cover of the sports page of the New York Daily News. “Bing Bong” even received two write-in votes in the 2021 New York City mayoral election. The phrase was further popularized by the viral "Bing Bong" trend on TikTok where users would recreate various different quotes from Sidetalk. Celebrities including President Joe Biden, The Jonas Brothers, John Legend, Lil Nas X, Olivia Rodrigo, Jack Harlow, and Avril Lavigne joined in on the trend.

Notable guests 
The following notable individuals appeared on the show as interviewees, unless otherwise noted:

 ASAP Rocky, as guest host
 Cardi B, as guest host
 Bobby Shmurda, as guest host
 Big Body Bes, as guest host
 Lil Uzi Vert
 Casey Neistat
 Ice Spice
 Jordan Clarkson
 Michael Rapaport
 David Dobrik
 Rowdy Rebel
 Curtis Sliwa
 Julia Fox
 Wayne Diamond

Episodes

References

English-language YouTube channels
Mass media in New York City
Comedy-related YouTube channels
Instagram accounts